This is a partial list of artworks produced by Pablo Picasso from 1951 to 1960.

1951 
Massacre in Korea (1951)
Baboon and Young (1951)
The election of Paris (1951)

1952 
Crâne de chèvre, bouteille et bougie (1952)
Paysage mediterranéen (1952)
The Dove with the Rainbow Background (1952)

1954 
Sylvette (1954)
Jacqueline with flowers (1954)
Jaqueline with crossed hands (1954)
Two Monkeys (May 11, 1954)

1955 
Don Quixote (1955)
Les Femmes d'Alger series (1955)
Les Femmes d'Alger ("Version A")
Les Femmes d'Alger ("Version B")
Les Femmes d'Alger ("Version C")
Les Femmes d'Alger ("Version D")
Les Femmes d'Alger ("Version E")
Les Femmes d'Alger ("Version F")
Les Femmes d'Alger ("Version G")
Les Femmes d'Alger ("Version H")
Les Femmes d'Alger ("Version I")
Les Femmes d'Alger ("Version J")
Les Femmes d'Alger ("Version K")
Les Femmes d'Alger ("Version L")
Les Femmes d'Alger ("Version M")
Les Femmes d'Alger ("Version N")
Les Femmes d'Alger ("Version O")
Mujer en espejo (17 June 1955)
Face (ceramic pitcher, 1955)

1956 
Femme dans l'atelier (Jacqueline Roque), 1956
Femmes devant la mer (1956) 
Toro (30 March 1956)
Personnage assis et personnage couché (1956)
Dans L'Atelier de Cannes (1956)

1957 
La Petite Corrida (1957)
Las meninas (1957)
La danse des fauns (1957)

1958 
La Folie (January 26, 1958)
Hands with Bouquet (1958)
Joueur de Flûte (23 August 1958)
Bulls-Vallaruis (1958)

1959 
Nude under a Pine Tree (1959)
Mujer delante del espejo (16 August 1959)
Scène de corrida (1959)
Un esbozo de mujer (30 April 1959)
Le Vieux Roi (1959)

1960 
In The Arena 25.2.60, lithograph (1960)
El Picador 15.6.60, lithograph (1960)
Femme accroupi (1960)
Tete de femme (Dora Maar) (1950s)

References 

1951-1960
Picasso 1951-1960
1950s in art